Masters of the Universe: Revelation is an American animated superhero fantasy television series produced by Kevin Smith and Powerhouse Animation Studios. A spiritual sequel to the 1983–1985 series He-Man and the Masters of the Universe by Filmation, while ignoring the events of The New Adventures of He-Man (1990), the plot of Revelation explores unresolved storylines from the original 1980s series. Netflix released the series in two parts, with five episodes debuting July 23, 2021, then five additional episodes on November 23, 2021. In June 2022, Netflix announced a follow-up Masters of the Universe: Revolution.

Premise
Skeletor's final assault on Castle Grayskull caused his own demise, while also putting an end to He-Man, and simultaneously damaging the source of all magic in existence. After their battle fractured Eternia, it's up to Teela to solve the mystery of the missing Sword of Power in a race against time to prevent the end of the Universe. Her journey will uncover the secrets of Grayskull at last.

Voice cast

Episodes

Production

Development
Netflix announced two new Masters of the Universe projects to be in development in December 2019: an adult-oriented anime series described as a direct sequel to the 1983 He-Man and the Masters of the Universe television series, and a CGI series aimed at children.

Kevin Smith officially announced Masters of the Universe: Revelation at the annual Power-Con convention in 2019, serving as showrunner and executive producer (despite stating that he was not a fan of the series), writing for the series alongside Eric Carrasco, Tim Sheridan, Diya Mishra, and Fatman Beyond co-host Marc Bernardin. During promotion for the show, Smith said that Revelation came to be out of a desire to tell a story set in the world of Eternia, while also being able to resolve any lingering plot threads from the original series. He also said that the show is set up as if it were the next episode of the original series, while also still being accessible to those who have never seen the original show. In November, ND Stevenson expressed interest in a potential crossover Christmas special between the series and their 2018–20 Netflix original series She-Ra and the Princesses of Power despite this being a sequel to the original series and a non-DreamWorks cartoon.

Casting 
The initial voice cast for the series was revealed, with Chris Wood as Prince Adam / He-Man and Mark Hamill as Skeletor. Three weeks before the show's premiere, three additional voice actors were announced to join the series with one of them being Dennis Haysbert to voice King Grayskull. In July 2022, Smith revealed that William Shatner had been cast in the sequel series, Masters of the Universe: Revolution. In March 2023, it was announced that Melissa Benoist would replace Sarah Michelle Gellar as Teela for Masters of the Universe: Revolution.

Animation
Around the same time as the show's announcement, Powerhouse Animation Studios was revealed to provide their services to the series, taking inspiration from Japanese anime.

Music
Bear McCreary composed the score of the series.

Follow-up series
In May 2022, Mark Hamill revealed he was recording more episodes of the series. The following month at Netflix's Geeked Week event, this follow-up series was revealed to be titled Masters of the Universe: Revolution.

Other media

Comic book
Dark Horse Comics and Mattel released a Masters of the Universe: Revelation comic as a tie-in to the series. The four-issue comic miniseries served as a prequel to the series. The first issue was released on July 7, 2021.

Aftershow
An aftershow titled Revelations: The Masters of the Universe Revelation Aftershow premiered alongside the series premiere on July 23, 2021, with Kevin Smith, Rob David, and Tiffany Smith serving as hosts.

Reception

Part 1 of Masters of the Universe: Revelation holds an approval rating of 92% based on 47 reviews, with an average rating of 7.3/10 on review aggregator website Rotten Tomatoes. The site's critics' consensus reads: "Armed with an incredible voice cast, Revelation smartly updates Masters of the Universe while retaining the quirky charms of the original to create a show that's bound to please fans and newcomers alike." Metacritic, which uses a weighted average, assigned a score of 72 out of 100 based on 8 critic reviews, indicating "generally favorable reviews".

Brian Tallerico, writing for RogerEbert.com, stated that "Smith and his team have threaded the needle that so many reboots fail to, making a show that feels both lovingly consistent with the source and fresh at the same time", and praised the show's visuals and voice acting. He concluded: "I think Masters of the Universe: Revelation will also send fans of it back to those originals as watchers of the '80s version show the new one to their kids". Kevin Johnson of The A.V. Club gave the show a grade of B, writing: "Smith and the creative team wink at and play into He-Man's corniest, outdated elements, but with a surprising amount of respect and admiration, while retaining a darker, richer sensibility."

Nick Schager, writing for The Daily Beast, said that the show "authentically resurrects the franchise's favorite characters while simultaneously updating them—and their adventures—for the 21st century", and concluded: "Masters of the Universe: Revelation is less about winning over newbies than about tapping into old fans’ cherished memories of childhood days gone by. In that respect, it accomplishes its mission—and there is, to be sure, some chance that Powerhouse's sterling animation will alone convince a few He-Man novices to take the plunge." Amanda Dyer of Common Sense Media gave the series a score of 4 stars out of 5, describing it as "exciting and action-packed" and said that it "makes a smooth transition into a more female-centered cast by following a new journey led by Grayskull Guardian Teela."

Brian Lowry of CNN described the show's tone as "edgier and clearly more ambitious, beginning with the fact that there's actual fighting", and added that Smith "approaches it all seriously -- or at least as earnestly as you can when a guy hoists a sword and shouts "By the power of Grayskull!"". Lowry wrote: "For those expecting something truly boundary-pushing, rest assured, no one will confuse this with Clerks." Zaki Hasan, writing for the San Francisco Chronicle, said that "while it's invigorating to see this world and its characters gussied up with a 2021 coat of paint, the whole venture does threaten at times to stumble under the weight of its own oppressive grimness", also adding: "It's as if Smith was so determined to emphasize how grown-up the new show is he forgot that this was originally a story for kids — and that it's OK for that to still be the case." Variety noted some fans had reacted negatively to the show compared to the overwhelmingly positive views of critics.

Part 2 has an approval rating of 92% based on 12 reviews, with an average rating of 7.40/10 on Rotten Tomatoes. Matt Fowler of IGN gave it 7 out of 10 and said it "continued on its path of rich characters, eye-popping animation, and terrifically twisted tweaks to the old He-Man formula."
Chris Jackson for Starburst Magazine, giving it 2 out of 5, noted "concerns over its ham-fisted handling of certain characters" and wrote that "overbearing exposition and a lack of action combine to take away any sense of urgency from what should have been the beginning of a non-stop five-episode thrill ride"

References

External links
Powerhouse Animation page

2020s American adult animated television series
2021 American television series debuts
English-language Netflix original programming
Action figures
Animated space adventure television series
Anime-influenced animation
Anime-influenced Western animation
Anime-influenced Western animated television series
American animated science fantasy television series
American adult animated superhero television series
Alternative sequel television series
American sequel television series
Animated superheroine television shows
Masters of the Universe television series
Television series about shapeshifting
Television shows based on Mattel toys
Television series set on fictional planets
Television series by Mattel Creations
Animated television series by Netflix
Works by Kevin Smith
2021 American television series endings